The KFS Premier-Liga or simply Crimean Premier League is a professional association football league in Crimea organized by Crimean Football Union (Krymsky Futbolny Soyuz) and devised by Russia after UEFA refused to allow Crimean clubs to switch to the Russian leagues in the wake of the 2014 Russian annexation of Crimea.

For full list of Crimean champions, see Republican Football Federation of Crimea. Both Republican Football Federation of Crimea and Crimean Football Union exist in Crimea. Sponsored by the Russian Ministry of Sports, the legal status of Crimean Football Union is not recognized by the Ukrainian Association of Football. The professional status of the league as it claims to be could not to be verified.

Status
The league was formed by UEFA delegation that is led by former president of the Slovak Football Association František Laurinec. Five of eight teams have never participated at professional level and according to the official UEFA evaluation the region has a poor football infrastructure. According to Laurinec "UEFA wants to help save football in Crimea." At the same time Ukrainian officials does not seem to be strongly against the separate league in Crimea, but do remain firm in their stance that Crimea is part of Ukraine.

In 2016 Vyacheslav Koloskov expressed his opinion that UEFA is not considering to grant Crimea a membership. At the same time, the president of the Crimean Football Union said that UEFA has two ways of solving the issue, either recognize Crimea as part of the Russian Federation or grant a membership like in case with Kosovo. There is an opinion that the Crimean football union can become the independent member of UEFA as Association of football of Gibraltar.

As its funding, most of the league's players come from the Russian mainland although does field some of its local players. Few Brazilian and Ukrainian players who chose to play in the league are under a risk of personal sanctions from the Ukrainian Association of Football.

In its third season attendance of the Crimean Premier League varied from about 3,500 spectators at one match to 300 at others. Not all the stadiums are up to standards. One club plays on its training field.

During a promotion/relegation game on 7 June 2018 entrance was free, gathering no more than 400 spectators. President of FC Avangard Yalta Igor Kashpirko acknowledged that some players, besides playing football, work elsewhere.

History
The first competitive match was a 2–2 draw between SKChF Sevastopol and TSK-Tavria Simferopol in August 2015. The UEFA sanctioned league has 8 teams: TSK Simferopol, SKCHF Sevastopol, Rubin Yalta, Bakhchisaray, Yevpatoriya, Kafa, Ocean Kerch and Berkut Evpatoria. TSK and SKCHF are relatively independent financially, while the rest six clubs in Crimea are financed by the Ministry of Sport of Russian Federation, according to a local journalist. There also were intentions to invite former Russian international football player Andrei Kanchelskis to coach one of the clubs in Crimea.

While sanctioned by UEFA, the Crimean Premier League is not listed as a regular top-level league.

Member clubs

Champions

See also
 Republican Football Federation of Crimea

References

External links 
 Official website

 
Football competitions in Crimea
Crimean Federal District
Football leagues in Russia
2015 establishments in Russia
Sports leagues established in 2015